Allen Nathaniel Harvin (born March 18, 1959) was an American football running back in the National Football League for the Washington Redskins. After graduating from Willingboro High School in Willingboro Township, New Jersey, he played college football at the University of Cincinnati. Harvin played in the USFL with the Philadelphia Stars in 1984 and the Baltimore Stars in 1985.

References

1959 births
Living people
American football running backs
Cincinnati Bearcats football players
Players of American football from New Jersey
People from Willingboro Township, New Jersey
Sportspeople from Burlington County, New Jersey
Players of American football  from Philadelphia
Washington Redskins players
Willingboro High School alumni